The 1992 AFC Asian Cup Final was a football match which determined the winner of the 1992 AFC Asian Cup, the 10th edition of the AFC Asian Cup, a quadrennial tournament contested by the men's national teams of the member associations of the Asian Football Confederation.

Venue

Hiroshima Big Arch also known as Edion Stadium Hiroshima, located in Hiroshima, Japan, hosted the 1992 AFC Asian Cup Final. The 36,894-seat stadium was built in 1992. It was the main stadium used to host the 1992 Asian Cup; eight matches were played in this stadium including the final.

Route to the final

Match

Final

References

External links 
 

Final
Saudi Arabia national football team matches
Japan national football team matches
1992 in Japanese sport
1992
November 1992 sports events in Asia
Sports competitions in Japan